Cross Connection  is a 2009 Indian Bengali romance drama film directed by Sudeshna Roy and Abhijit Guha. The film released theatrically on 1 May 2009.This film is the debut of Abir Chatterjee as lead hero in Bengali cinema.

Plot
The film revolves around four youths who try to discover their perfect love matches. Things repeatedly go wrong till they get resolved on Mandarmani beach near Kolkata. Imon, is a pretty, modern dancer and choreographer with a steady boyfriend Akaash who is a happy-go-lucky young man. Akaash is not confident about his English yet does not suffer a complex because his girlfriend is good at it. The problem is that they keep fighting all the time till it breaks up. The two are quick to find two other youngsters, Vicky and Piya to replace their former steady mates. But who is the right partner for the other? Is Vicky better than Akaash for Imon or would she rather stick to the troublesome Akaash? Is the ambitious, beautiful and petite Payal good enough for Akaash or would she rather go along with the USA-returned Vicky who is a short while away from flying off to Toronto? This is a love story with the modern generation X in mind. There is romance, there is cynicism, ambition and love. Above all there is comedy and a touch of sex without which no love story is complete. Cross connection deals with Imon’s three loves, Aakash’s three loves, Piya’s switches and Vicky’s intentions. This is a love story where egos clash to raise a laugh.

Cast
 Ritwick Chakraborty as Aakash
 Abir Chatterjee as Vickey a.k.a. Vikram
 Rimjhim Mitra as Imon
 Payel Sarkar as Piya
 Biswajit Chakraborty as Imon's Father
 Saswata Chatterjee 
 Kamalika
 Surojit Banerjee
 Sudeshna Roy
 Abhrajit Chakraborty
 Arijit-Rono

References

External links
 

2009 films
Bengali-language Indian films
2000s Bengali-language films
Films directed by Abhijit Guha and Sudeshna Roy
Indian romantic drama films